Linneus Lincoln Westfall (April 5, 1865 – January 31, 1927) was an American politician in the state of Washington. He served in the Washington House of Representatives and Washington State Senate.

References

1865 births
1927 deaths
Republican Party members of the Washington House of Representatives
Republican Party Washington (state) state senators